An arthropathy is a disease of a joint.

Types
Arthritis is a form of arthropathy that involves inflammation of one or more joints, while the term arthropathy may be used regardless of whether there is inflammation or not.

Joint diseases can be classified as follows:
 Arthritis
Infectious arthritis
Septic arthritis (infectious)
 Tuberculosis arthritis
 Reactive arthritis (indirectly)
Noninfectious arthritis
Seronegative spondyloarthropathy:
Psoriatic arthritis
Ankylosing spondylitis
Rheumatoid arthritis: Felty's syndrome
Juvenile idiopathic arthritis
 Adult-onset Still's disease
Crystal arthropathy
Gout
Chondrocalcinosis
Osteoarthritis
 Hemarthrosis (joint bleeding)
 Synovitis is the medical term for inflammation of the synovial membrane.
 Joint dislocation

With arthropathy in the name
 Reactive arthropathy (M02-M03) is caused by an infection, but not a direct infection of the synovial space. (See also Reactive arthritis)
 Enteropathic arthropathy (M07) is caused by colitis and related conditions.
 Crystal arthropathy (also known as crystal arthritis) (M10-M11) involves the deposition of crystals in the joint.
 In gout, the crystal is uric acid.
 In pseudogout/chondrocalcinosis/calcium pyrophosphate deposition disease, the crystal is calcium pyrophosphate.
 Diabetic arthropathy (M14.2, E10-E14) is caused by diabetes.
 Neuropathic arthropathy'' (M14.6) is associated with a loss of sensation.

Spondylarthropathy is any form of arthropathy of the vertebral column.

Signs and symptoms
Joint pain is a common but non-specific sign of joint disease. Signs will depend on the specific disease, and may even then vary. Common signs may include:
 Decreased range of motion
 Stiffness
 Effusion
 Pneumarthrosis, air in a joint (which is also a common normal finding).
 Bone erosion
 Systemic signs of arthritis such as fatigue

Diagnosis
Diagnosis may be a combination of medical history, physical examination, blood tests and medical imaging (generally X-ray initially).

Treatment

References

External links 

Inflammatory polyarthropathies
Infectious arthropathies